The Alley of Classics is a sculptural complex located in Bălți, Moldova.

Busts
The Alley of Classics contains 3 busts:

See also
 Alley of Classics, Chişinău

References

External links 
 La Bălți va fi inaugurată Aleea Clasicilor 
 Aleea Clasicilor va fi inaugurat la Balti pana la sfarsitul lunii iunie 
 La Bălţi a fost deschisă Aleea Clasicilor Culturii Naţionale

Monuments and memorials in Bălți
Tourist attractions in Moldova
Museums established in 2010
2010 establishments in Moldova